news.com.au is an Australian website owned by News Corp Australia. It had 9.6 million unique readers in April 2019 and covers national and international news, lifestyle, travel, entertainment, technology, finance, and sport.

Staff
The organization employs about 80 journalists, among them Samantha Maiden as national political editor, and Joe Hildebrand as contributor.

Web analytics
According to third-party web analytics providers, Alexa and SimilarWeb, news.com.au was the 19th and 27th most visited website in Australia respectively, as of July 2015. SimilarWeb rates the site as the third most visited news website in Australia, attracting more than 18 million visitors per month. Nielsen Online Ratings rated news.com.au as Australia's most popular news website as of January 2015.

Whilst frequently ranked as the number-one visited Australian news website in Australia during 2019, as of June 2020, news.com.au has slipped to the third most visited news website in Australia after ABC News Online and Daily Mail Australia.

Awards
Walkley Awards 2021: June Andrews Women’s Leadership in Media – 'Let Her Speak'
Our Watch Award 2021 – Samantha Maiden for her Brittany Higgins exclusive
Mumbrella Publish Awards 2021: Journalist of the Year – Samantha Maiden
Mumbrella Publish Awards 2021: Single Article of the Year – Samantha Maiden for her report on Brittany Higgins
B&T's Women In Media Awards 2021: Woman of the Year – Nina Funnell for LetHerSpeak
B&T's Women In Media Awards 2021: Glass Ceiling Award – Nina Funnell
B&T's Women In Media Awards 2021: Journalist of the Year – Nina Funnell

See also

Mass media in Australia
Journalism in Australia

References

External links

Australian news websites
News Corp Australia
Year of establishment missing